Hardcore Vanilla is the third studio album by the industrial band H3llb3nt. It was released in 2001 on Invisible Records.

Track listing

Personnel 
Adapted from the Hardcore Vanilla liner notes.

H3llb3nt
 Bryan Barton – electric guitar, programming, vocals, musical arrangement, cover art, design
 Charles Levi – bass guitar
 Jared Louche – vocals, musical arrangement
 Eric Powell – electric guitar, programming, vocals, musical arrangement

Additional musicians
 Martin Atkins – drums, musical arrangement, production, engineering, mastering
 Steve Aylett – vocals (2)
 Meg Lee Chin – vocals
 John DeSalvo – loops
 Lee Fraser – loops
 Jason McNinch – electric guitar
 Julie Plante – vocals (10)
 Raymond Watts – vocals and programming (9)
 Anna Wildsmith – vocals (11)

Production and design
 Chris Greene – mastering
 H3llb3nt – production
 Victoria Straub – photography

Release history

References

External links 
 

2001 albums
H3llb3nt albums
Albums produced by Martin Atkins
Invisible Records albums